Asparagus rubicundus  ("red-stemmed asparagus") is a fluffy, thorny shrub of the Asparagus genus, that is indigenous to South Africa and southern Namibia.

Description

This species of Asparagus grows as a thorny bush, to a height of 1,5 metres.

Stems are erect, round, smooth, shiny and have a distinctive dark-brown colour.

At each node along a stem, below the branch, there is a single, recurved-spreading (max.6mm) thorn.

The numerous, thread-like leaves are in feathery tufts of about 10. Individual leaves are small (3-7mm), linear-cylindrical, slightly curved, and slightly broader towards their tips.

The flowers (March–June) are white, usually solitary, and have brown stamens. 
The berries are reddish or black, each with a single seed.

The young shoots of this plant are edible, like those of commercial asparagus.

Related species 
This species is part of a group of closely related African Asparagus species, including Asparagus lignosus, Asparagus concinnus and Asparagus microraphis.

Distribution

It occurs throughout the southern and western Cape, as far north as Namibia, and as far east as Uitenhage. 
It is usually found in coarse sandy, clay or granite-based soil in fynbos or renosterveld vegetation and coastal sand plains.

References

Further reading
 

rubicundus
Flora of the Cape Provinces
Creepers of South Africa
Renosterveld